The Sun Flightcraft Air-Chopper is an Austrian powered parachute that was designed by Herbert Hofbauer and produced by Sun Flightcraft of Innsbruck. Now out of production, when it was available the aircraft was supplied complete and ready-to-fly.

The aircraft was introduced before 2003 and production ended in about 2008 when the model was discontinued. The company no longer manufactures powered parachutes.

Design and development
It employs a  Cruiser 26 Elan rectangular canopy or, optionally, a Chiron Sycon-Aircraft elliptical parachute-style wing. Features include two-seats-in-tandem accommodation with dual throttles, tricycle landing gear and a single  Rotax 582 engine in pusher configuration with a 2.62:1 "E" gearbox driving a contra-rotating Coax-P aircraft propeller to eliminate torque effects.

The aircraft carriage is built from bolted 6082-T6 aluminium tubing with 7075-T6 aluminium hardware, plus steel bolts. In flight steering is accomplished via foot pedals that actuate the canopy brakes, creating roll and yaw. On the ground the aircraft has handlebar-controlled nosewheel steering similar to a motorcycle. The main landing gear incorporates fibreglass spring rod suspension. Factory options included balloon tires, leather seats, a front wheel brake,
front headlight, side panniers and dual control canopy steering.

Specifications (Air-Chopper)

References

External links

Air-Chopper
2000s Austrian sport aircraft
2000s Austrian ultralight aircraft
Single-engined pusher aircraft
Powered parachutes